Yuri Yuryevich Kokoyev (born 21 August 1980) is a former Russian football player.

External links
 

1980 births
People from Tskhinvali
Living people
Russian footballers
FC Spartak Vladikavkaz players
Russian Premier League players
FC Zhemchuzhina Sochi players
FC Chernomorets Novorossiysk players
Association football forwards
FC Dynamo Stavropol players
FC Spartak-UGP Anapa players